The Scottish Borders ('the Marches') is one of 32 council areas of Scotland. It borders the City of Edinburgh, Dumfries and Galloway, East Lothian, Midlothian, South Lanarkshire, West Lothian and, to the south-west, south and east, the English counties of Cumbria and Northumberland. The administrative centre of the area is Newtown St Boswells.

The term Scottish Borders, or normally just "the Borders", is also used to designate the areas of southern Scotland and northern England that bound the Anglo-Scottish border.

Geography
The Scottish Borders are in the eastern part of the Southern Uplands.

The region is hilly and largely rural, with the River Tweed flowing west to east through it. The highest hill in the region is Broad Law in the Manor Hills. In the east of the region, the area that borders the River Tweed is flat and is known as 'The Merse'. The Tweed and its tributaries drain the entire region with the river flowing into the North Sea at Berwick-upon-Tweed in Northumberland, and forming the border with England for the last twenty miles or so of its length.

The term Central Borders refers to the area in which the majority of the main towns and villages of Galashiels, Selkirk, Hawick, Jedburgh, Earlston, Kelso, Newtown St Boswells, St Boswells, Peebles, Melrose and Tweedbank are located.

Two of Scotland's 40 national scenic areas (defined so as to identify areas of exceptional scenery and to ensure their protection from inappropriate development) lie within the region:
 The Eildon and Leaderfoot National Scenic Area covers the scenery surrounding Eildon Hill, usually called the Eildons because of the three 'peaks', and extends to include the town of Melrose and Leaderfoot Viaduct.
 The Upper Tweeddale National Scenic Area covers the scenery surrounding the upper part of the River Tweed between Broughton and Peebles.

Largest towns
2011
Galashiels: 14,994 
Hawick: 14,294
Peebles: 8,376
Selkirk: 5,784 
Kelso: 5,639
Jedburgh: 4,030
Eyemouth: 3,546
Innerleithen: 3,031
Duns: 2,753
Melrose: 2,307
Coldstream: 1,946
Earlston: 1,779

History
The term Borders sometimes has a wider use, referring to all of the counties adjoining the English border, also including Dumfriesshire and Kirkcudbrightshire, as well as Northumberland, Cumberland and Westmorland in England.

Roxburghshire and Berwickshire historically bore the brunt of the conflicts with England, both during declared wars such as the Wars of Scottish Independence, and armed raids which took place in the times of the Border Reivers. During this period, at the western end of the border there was a strip of country, called the "Debatable Land", because the possession of it was a constant source of contention between England and Scotland until its boundaries were adjusted in 1552. Thus, across the region are to be seen the ruins of many castles, abbeys and even towns. The only other important conflict belongs to the Covenanters' time, when the marquess of Montrose was defeated at the Battle of Philiphaugh in 1645. Partly for defence and partly to overawe the freebooters and moss-troopers who were a perpetual threat until they were suppressed later in the 17th century, castles were erected at various points on both sides of the border.

From early on, the two sovereigns agreed on the duty to regulate the borders. The Scottish Marches system was set up, under the control of three wardens from each side, who generally kept the peace through several centuries until being replaced by the Middle Shires under James VI/I.

Administrative history

Prior to 1975 the area that is now Scottish Borders was administered as the four separate counties of Berwickshire, Peeblesshire, Roxburghshire, and Selkirkshire, plus part of Midlothian. An elected county council was established for each county in 1890 under the Local Government (Scotland) Act 1889. The county councils were abolished in 1975 under the Local Government (Scotland) Act 1973, which established a two-tier structure of local government comprising upper-tier regions and lower-tier districts. A region called Borders was created covering the area. The region contained four districts, called Berwickshire, Ettrick and Lauderdale, Roxburgh, and Tweeddale. The Borders Regional Council was based at Regional Headquarters in Newtown St Boswells, which had been the offices of Roxburghshire County Council prior to the reforms.

Further local government reform in 1996 under the Local Government etc. (Scotland) Act 1994 saw the area's four districts and the regional council abolished, with a new unitary authority created covering the same area as the former Borders Region. The 1994 Act called the new council area "The Borders", but the shadow council elected in 1995 to oversee the transition changed the name to "Scottish Borders" prior to the changes coming into effect in 1996.

Language and literature
Although there is evidence of some Scottish Gaelic in the origins of place names such as Innerleithen ("confluence of the Leithen"), Kilbucho and Longformacus, which contain identifiably Goidelic rather than Brythonic Celtic elements and are an indication of at least a Gaelic-speaking elite in the area, the main languages in the area since the 5th century appear to have been Brythonic (in the west) and Old English (in the east), the latter of which developed into its modern forms of English and Scots.

Border ballads occupied a distinctive place in literature. Many of them were rescued from oblivion by Walter Scott, who gathered materials for his Minstrelsy of the Scottish Border, which appeared in 1802 and 1803. Border traditions and folklore, and the picturesque incidents of which the country was so often the scene, appealed strongly to James Hogg ("the Ettrick Shepherd"), John Wilson, writing as "Christopher North", and John Mackay Wilson, whose Tales of the Borders, published in 1835, enjoyed popular favour throughout the 1800s.

Governance

Constituencies
There are two British Parliamentary constituencies in the Scottish Borders; Berwickshire, Roxburgh and Selkirk covers most of the region and is represented by John Lamont of the Conservatives. The western Tweeddale area is included in the Dumfriesshire, Clydesdale & Tweeddale constituency and is represented by David Mundell of the Conservatives.

At Scottish Parliament level, there are also two seats. The eastern constituency is Ettrick, Roxburgh and Berwickshire, which is currently represented by Conservative Rachael Hamilton. The western constituency is Midlothian South, Tweeddale and Lauderdale and is represented by SNP Christine Grahame.

Political control

The first election to the Borders Regional Council was held in 1974, initially operating as a shadow authority alongside the outgoing authorities until the new system came into force on 16 May 1975. A shadow authority was again elected in 1995 ahead of the reforms which came into force on 1 April 1996. Political control of the council since 1975 has been as follows:

Borders Regional Council

Scottish Borders Council

Leadership
The first leader of the council following the 1996 reforms was Drew Tulley, who had been the last leader of the former Ettrick and Lauderdale District Council. The leaders since 1996 have been:

Elections
Since 2007 elections have been held every five years under the single transferable vote system, introduced by the Local Governance (Scotland) Act 2004. Election results since 1995 have been as follows:

Population
At the census held on 27 March 2011, the population of the region was 114,000 (provisional total), an increase of 6.78% from the 106,764 enumerated at the previous (2001) census.

Transport
Until September 2015, the region had no working railway stations. Although the area was well connected to the Victorian railway system, the branch lines that supplied it were closed in the decades following the Second World War. A bill was passed by the Scottish Parliament to extend the Waverley Line, which aimed to re-introduce a commuter service from Edinburgh to Stow, Galashiels and Tweedbank. This section of the route re-opened on 6 September 2015, under the Borders Railway branding. The other railway route running through the region is the East Coast Main Line, with Edinburgh Waverley, Dunbar and Berwick being the nearest stations on that line, all of which are outwith the Borders. Since 2014 there has been discussion of re-opening the station at Reston which is within the region and would serve Eyemouth. To the west, Carlisle, Carstairs and Lockerbie are the nearest stations on the West Coast Main Line.

The area is served by buses which connect the main population centres. Express bus services link the main towns with rail stations at Edinburgh and Carlisle.

The region also has no commercial airports; the nearest are Edinburgh and Newcastle, both of which are international airports.

The main roads to and from the region are:
The A1, which runs along the east coast from London to Edinburgh; passing near Eyemouth.
The A7 which runs north to south from Edinburgh to Carlisle and the M6; passing through Galashiels, Selkirk and Hawick.
The A68 running from Darlington to Edinburgh; passing through Jedburgh, St Boswells, Earlston and Lauder.
The A72, which runs east to west from Galashiels to Hamilton; passing through Innerleithen and Peebles

Towns and villages
Abbey St. Bathans, Allanton, Ancrum, Ashkirk, Ayton
Broughton, Burnmouth
Camptown, Cardrona, Chirnside, Clovenfords, Cockburnspath, Coldingham, Coldstream
Denholm, Dryburgh, Duns, Scottish Borders
Earlston, Edgerston, Edrom, Eddleston, Ettrick, Ettrickbridge, Eyemouth
Foulden
Galashiels, Grantshouse, Greenlaw
Hawick, Heriot, Hutton
Innerleithen
Jedburgh
Kelso, Kirk Yetholm
Lauder, Lilliesleaf, Longformacus
Melrose, Morebattle
Newcastleton, Newstead, Newtown St Boswells
Oxton
Peebles, Preston, Paxton
Reston, Roxburgh
Selkirk, St. Abbs, St Boswells, Stow, Stichill, Swinside, Swinton
Teviothead, Town Yetholm, Traquair, Tweedbank, Tweedsmuir
Walkerburn, West Linton, Whitsome
Yair

Places of interest

See also
Borders College
Scottish Marches
Anglo-Scottish border
Debatable lands
List of places in the Scottish Borders
Scottish Lowlands
Alexander Jeffrey, historian of Scottish Borders

Notes and references

External links

Borders' Dialect
Scots Language Centre page on Borders' Dialect
Scottish Borders Council
Region Website

 
Council areas of Scotland
Regions of Scotland
Northumbria
Southern Uplands